William Gray Box (25 December 1927 – 2013) was a Scottish footballer who played for Arbroath and Dumbarton.

Box died in Stirling in 2013, at the age of 85.

References

1927 births
2013 deaths
People from Govan
Footballers from Glasgow
Scottish footballers
Dumbarton F.C. players
Arbroath F.C. players
Scottish Football League players
Scottish Junior Football Association players
Association football wing halves
Rutherglen Glencairn F.C. players